Schulenburg Independent School District is a public school district based in Schulenburg, Texas (USA).

Schulenburg High School is a 2A school with approximately 240 
students located midway between San Antonio and Houston on Interstate 10.

Schulenburg won the U.I.L. Class 2A state football title in 1991 and 1992 under Coach David Husmann.

In 2011, the school district was rated "academically acceptable" by the Texas Education Agency.

Head Football Coach: Walt Brock
Head Volleyball Coach: Donald Zapalac
Head Boys Basketball: Richard Hoogendoorn
Head Girls Basketball: Phillip Eddins 
Head Baseball: Jason Bougio
Head Softball: Gilbert Price
Head Boys Track: Rene Valdez
Head Girls Track: Donald Zapalac
Head Powerlifting: Justin Lookingbill

Schools
Schulenburg Secondary School (Grades 6-12)
2011 Rated "academically acceptable" by the Texas Education Agency.
Schulenburg Elementary School (Grades PK-5)
2008 National Blue Ribbon School
2011 Rated "academically unacceptable" by the Texas Education Agency.

Technology 
Over 400 computers are available to staff and students throughout the district.  All faculty and staff have access to a GroupWise e-mail system.

References

External links
Schulenburg ISD
 Great schools

School districts in Fayette County, Texas